Aaron Blaise (born February 17, 1968) is an American painter, animator, film director and art instructor. He is known for his work on Beauty and the Beast (1991), Aladdin (1992) and Brother Bear (2003). He was nominated for Academy Award for Best Animated Feature Film for the Brother Bear.

Life and work
Aaron Blaise was born on February 17, 1968, in Burlington, Vermont. He graduated from Ringling College of Art and Design in 1989 as an illustrator.
In 1989 he started working as an animator and supervising animator at Walt Disney Animation Studios for 8 years on such films as The Rescuers Down Under, Beauty and the Beast, Aladdin, The Lion King, Pocahontas, and Mulan. Starting in 1997, he worked as a director for 12 years, and co-directed Brother Bear, a nominee for the 76th Academy Award for Animated Feature.  After its release he relocated to Disney's Burbank animation studios where he developed several projects.

On March 11, 2007, his wife passed away and he left Disney. In 2013, he worked at Paramount Pictures for less than a year as a visual development artist. From 2010 to 2014 he worked at Tradition Studios as a director on The Legend of Tembo but the company went bankrupt. In 2012, with his business partner, Nick Burch, he started CreatureArtTeacher, offering lessons and tutorials based on Blaise's long career.

Filmography

Animation department

Director

Art department

References

External links
 Official website
 

1968 births
American animators
Living people
People from Vermont
Ringling College of Art and Design alumni
Walt Disney Animation Studios people